My Life: A Spoken Autobiography by Fidel Castro and Ignacio Ramonet was published in Spanish in 2006 (Fidel Castro: Biografía a dos voces), and English in 2008. The book was written by Ramonet based on more than 100 hours of interviews with Castro.

Political autobiographies
Works by Fidel Castro
2006 non-fiction books